Damjan Fras (born 21 February 1973) is a Slovenian former ski jumper who competed from 1990 to 2006. His career best achievement was winning a bronze medal at the 2002 Winter Olympics in Salt Lake City in the team large hill event. Fras also won bronze in the individual normal hill event at the 1991 World Junior Championships and finished third three times in the individual normal hill events in Velenje at Continental Cup level.

References

External links

 
 

1973 births
Living people
Skiers from Ljubljana
Slovenian male ski jumpers
Ski jumpers at the 1992 Winter Olympics
Ski jumpers at the 2002 Winter Olympics
Olympic ski jumpers of Slovenia
Olympic bronze medalists for Slovenia
Olympic medalists in ski jumping
Medalists at the 2002 Winter Olympics
21st-century Slovenian people